James Tocco (born 1943) is an American concert pianist.  He is the youngest of thirteen children born to Vincenzo and Rose Tocco, both Sicilian immigrants.

Early life
Born of Sicilian immigrant parents in Detroit, Michigan, Tocco's love of music -especially opera—began in early childhood. At six years old he began studying piano and at twelve he made his orchestral debut, performing Beethoven's Second Piano Concerto. He won a scholarship to the Salzburg Mozarteum and a French government grant to study with Magda Tagliaferro in Paris. His classical music education was completed with Claudio Arrau in New York. Soon afterward, he became more prominent with his first-prize victory in the ARD International Music Competition in Munich, followed being a replacement for Arturo Benedetti Michelangeli as guest soloist for the Tchaikovsky First Piano Concerto at the Vienna Festival.

Career
In the years since then he has performed internationally, throughout North and South America, Europe, the Soviet Union, Japan, Australia, South Africa] and the Middle East. His orchestral engagements include:

Cleveland and Minnesota orchestras;
Berlin Philharmonic
London Philharmonic
Hong Kong and Munich philharmonics
London, Houston, Pittsburgh, Cincinnati, Detroit, Chicago, New World, National, and NHK (Japan) symphonies.

Conductors
Conductors with whom he has collaborated include:
Marin Alsop
David Atherton
Esa-Pekka Salonen
Jesús Lopez-Cobos
Andrew Litton
Yoav Talmi
Robert Shaw
 Yoel Levi
 Zdenek Macal
Eduardo Mata

Musical Performance
Tocco is a recitalist, orchestral soloist, chamber musician, and educator. He has performed many American and European masterworks, including Bernstein's Age of Anxiety, which he recorded with Leonard Slatkin and the BBC London Symphony Orchestra, and John Corigliano's Piano Concerto.

The pianist's performances included his Royal Concertgebouw Orchestra debut, performing the MacDowell Concerto and Gershwin's Rhapsody in Blue, both conducted by Leonard Slatkin. An especially accomplished recitalist, Tocco has performed interpretations of Beethoven, Chopin, and Liszt, as well as 20th-century composers, and he regularly programs the keyboard works of Handel. Other performances include Bernstein's Age of Anxiety with Marin Alsop and the New York Symphony, and Leonard Slatkin and the London-based BBC Symphony orchestra.

Discography

Tocco's discography includes:

Bernstein's complete solo piano music
Solo piano version of the Suite from Rodeo
The complete Chopin Préludes
The complete piano music of Charles Tomlinson Griffes
Erwin Schulhof's Cinq Etudes de Jazz
Bach-Liszt organ transcriptions
Copland Music for Piano
Various chamber music of Eduard Franck.
Four piano sonatas of Edward MacDowell.

Recently, he performed a recording of Corigliano's Etude-Fantasy on Sony Classical.

Educational Work

In addition to his itinerary, Tocco is Eminent Scholar/Artist in Residence at the University of Cincinnati College-Conservatory of Music, a faculty member at the Manhattan School of Music and professor of piano at the Musikhochschule in Lübeck, Germany. Tocco is the co-founder and original artistic director of the Great Lakes Chamber Music Festival in Bloomfield Hills, Michigan.
Co-founder is James Tocco's brother, Reverend Monsignor Anthony Tocco of St. Hugo of the Hills Catholic Church.

Honors
He is a National Patron of Delta Omicron, an international professional music fraternity.

References
Manhattan School of Music: James Tocco
John F. Kennedy Centre for the Performing Arts: James Tocco
University of Cincinnati, College-Conservatory of Music: James Tocco
Hexagone.net: Classical Music Academies - James Tocco
ArkivMusic: James Tocco Lists 15 albums on several different record labels.

Reviews
The New York Times, February 5, 1986: Recital - James Tocco, Liszt and Bach Tribute. Review by Donal Henahan
The New York Times, August 12, 2005: Adventures Outside the Classical Canon: Pathfinding Composers "Here are some favorite contemporary recordings of the classical-music critics of The New York Times."

1943 births
American classical pianists
Male classical pianists
American male pianists
Living people
Manhattan School of Music faculty
Piano pedagogues
20th-century American pianists
21st-century classical pianists
20th-century American male musicians
21st-century American male musicians
21st-century American pianists
Academic staff of the Lübeck Academy of Music